Pikalevo is a rural locality (a village) in Krasnoplamenskoye Rural Settlement, Alexandrovsky District, Vladimir Oblast, Russia. The population was 2 as of 2010. It is a very small settlement consisting of a single street.

Geography 
Pikalevo is located 48 km northwest of Alexandrov (the district's administrative centre) by road. Izmaylovo is the nearest rural locality.

References 

Rural localities in Alexandrovsky District, Vladimir Oblast